Matteo Calamai (born 10 March 1991) is an Italian professional footballer who plays as a midfielder for  club San Donato.

Club career
Formed on Fiorentina and Siena youth system, Calamai made his professional debut for Viareggio on 2010–11 Serie C season.

On 14 July 2021, he joined to Legnago Salus. On 27 January 2022, his contract with Legnago was terminated by mutual consent.

International career
Calamai was a youth international for Italy.

References

External links
 

1991 births
Living people
People from Fiesole
Sportspeople from the Metropolitan City of Florence
Footballers from Tuscany
Italian footballers
Association football midfielders
Serie C players
Serie D players
A.C.N. Siena 1904 players
F.C. Esperia Viareggio players
A.C. Carpi players
Venezia F.C. players
Paganese Calcio 1926 players
S.S. Ischia Isolaverde players
F.C. Lumezzane V.G.Z. A.S.D. players
Cosenza Calcio players
Olbia Calcio 1905 players
Modena F.C. 2018 players
AZ Picerno players
Rimini F.C. 1912 players
A.C. Prato players
F.C. Legnago Salus players
San Donato Tavarnelle players
Italy youth international footballers